Maria Papayanni (born 27 May 1964) is a Greek author. She writes books for children and young adults.

Biography 

Papayanni was born in Larissa, Greece. She studied Greek language and literature at the Aristotle University of Thessaloniki and for many years she worked as a journalist on TV, radio, newspapers, and magazines. She later started writing books for children and teenagers and translating books into Greek language. She has also written theatrical plays for children and librettos.

Papayanni has won numerous awards for her literary work, including the Children's Book Award of the Greek section of the International Board on Books for Young People (IBBY) and the Greek National Prize for Youth Literature.

In 1993, she married composer Thanos Mikroutsikos; together, they have two children.

Awards
2017 Greek IBBY awards for Children's Literature (Shoes with Wings)

2011 State Prize for Children's Literature (The Lonesome Tree)

2011 Diavazo Literary Magazine Award (The Lonesome Tree)

2007 Diavazo Literary Magazine Award (As If By Magic)

2007 Greek IBBY awards for Children's Literature (As If By Magic)

2004 Greek IBBY awards for Children's Literature (Catch Them!)

Nominee for the 2020 Hans Christian Andersen Award.

Works

Novels

(2003) Will You Do Me a Favour, Santa?
Original title: Άγιε Βασίλη,θα µου κάνεις µια χάρη;

(2003) An Adventure for Romeo
Original title: Μια περιπέτεια για το Ρωµαίο

(2003) Catch them! (co-written with Philippos Mandilaras)
Original title: Πιάστε τους!

(2006) As If By Magic
Original title: Ως διά µαγείας

(2008) My Name is Maya
Illustrated by Yorgos Sgouros
Original title: Με λένε Μάγια

(2009) Around the World on a Bicycle
Original title: Ο γύρος του κόσµου µε το ποδήλατο

(2010) The Lonesome Tree
Original title: Το ∆έντρο το Μονάχο

(2016) Shoes with Wings
Original title: Παπούτσια µε φτερά

Picture books

(2001) Goodnight, Mom
Original title: Καληνύχτα, µαµά!

(2006) The Dream Thief
Original title: Η κλέφτρα των ονείρων

(2007) Isn't It Strange?
Original title: Παράξενο δεν είναι; Το χρυσοφλιδάκι της γης

(2008) Christmas: Time for Miracles
Original title: Χριστούγεννα, καιρός για θαύµατα

(2012) Christmas Topsy-Turvy
Original title: Εκείνα τα Χριστούγεννα ήρθαν τα κάτω πάνω!

(2013) I Want To Win! / On ne gagne pas tous les jours / Wer gewinnt?
Minedition

(2013) Miltos, Mina, Rosalia, Che, and the... suitcase
Maria Papayanni's story “Che and his Father” is included in this collection of stories that the authors donated to A.P.H.C.A.
Original title: Ο Μίλτος, η Μίνα, η Ροζαλία, ο Τσε και... η βαλίτσα
Association for the Psychosocial Health of Children And Adolescents (A.P.H.C.A.)

(2015) The King Who Had Too Much of Everything
Original title: Είχε απ’ όλα και είχε πολλά
• Included in the White Ravens catalogue, compiled by the Internationale Jugendbibliothek, (International Youth Library), in Munich.

(2017) The Moonling
Original title: Τουλάχιστον δύο

(2018) The Adventures of Nils
Selma Lagerlöf's “The Wonderful Adventures of Nils” retold for very young children. 
Original title: Πες το µ’ ένα παραµύθι - Οι περιπέτειες του Νιλς

Early Readers

(2004) Who's in Charge?
Original title: Ποιος είναι ο αρχηγός;

(2005) How Long is ‘Always’?
Original title: Πάντα;

(2005) Top of The Class
Original title: Πρώτος!

(2006) The Accidental Bookworm!
Original title: Βιβλιοφάγος κατά... λάθος!

(2007) Go to the Blackboard!
Original title: Στον πίνακα!

(2008) Back to School
Original title: Επιστροφή στο σχολείο

(2014) Petros’ Stories
(an anniversary edition that includes the stories: Who's in Charge?, The Accidental Bookworm!, Go to the Blackboard!, How Long is ‘Always’?, Top of The Class, Back to School)
Original title: Οι µικρές ιστορίες του Πέτρου

(2005) Tomorrow the Earth Will Grow
Original title: Τρεις παλάµες όλη η Γη

(2012) Ellie on the Moon
Original title: Η Έλλη στο φεγγάρι

(2015) Ellie's Secret Recipe
Original title: Η µυστική συνταγή της Έλλης

CDs and Books with CDs

(2007) Isn't it Strange?
Music by Thanos Mikroutsikos
Story & lyrics by Maria Papayanni, Melina Karakosta
Original title: Παράξενο δεν είναι;

(2017) Says One, Says the Other
Music by Thanos Mikroutsikos
Story & lyrics by Maria Papayanni
Original title: Λέγε ο ένας, λέγε ο άλλος...

References

Further reading
 Information in the site of Hellenic Foundation of Culture
 HCAA Nominees 2020
 International Board on Books for Young People (IBBY)
 Interview in DOCUMENTONEWS
 Interview in NAFTEMPORIKI
 Article in German Wikipedia
 Official site

1964 births
Living people
21st-century Greek writers
Writers from Larissa
21st-century Greek women writers
Greek children's writers
Greek women children's writers